The MV Karadeniz Powership Osman Khan is a Liberia-flagged floating power plant, owned and operated by Karpowership. In 2016, she was solemnly sent off from the Hat-San Shipyard in Altinova, Yalova, Turkey to Ghana to supply electricity to the power grid.

Cargo ship 
The ship was built in 2000  as a bulk carrier by Samsung Shipbuilding in Geoje, South Korea.

The vessel was owned by the Australian company Teekay Shipping Aıstralia in Sydney.

Powership 
The Turkish company Karadeniz Holding purchased the vessel MV Pacific Triangle end 2014 for US$17 million from Teekay Shipping. The bulk carrier was converted into a Powership with a generation capacity of 470 MW at Hat-San Shipyard in Altinova, Yalova. On November 13, 2016, the Powership, renamed MV Karadeniz Powership Osman Khan, sailed to Ghana in a ceremony attended by the President Recep Tayyip Erdoğan, Prime Minister Binali Yıldırım, Minister of Transport, Maritime and Communication Ahmet Arslan and other officials. She was commissioned to supply electricity to the power grid in Ghana. She is world's biggest Powership.

Ship's registry 
 ex-MV Pacific Triangle, Liberia-flagged, owned by Teekay Shipping Aıstralia in Sydney, Australia.

See also 

 List of power stations in Ghana
 Electricity sector in Ghana

References 

2000 ships
Bulk carriers
Ships built by Samsung Heavy Industries
Ships of Liberia
osman Khan
Electric power infrastructure in Ghana
Ships built at Sedef Shipyard